This is a listing of schools in North Charleston, South Carolina.

Elementary schools

1 A.C. Corcoran Elementary School - Charleston County School District (CCSD)

2 Chicora Elementary School - CCSD

3 Eagle Nest Elementary School - Dorchester District 2 (DD2)

4 Edmund A. Burns Elementary School - CCSD

5 Fort Dorchester Elementary School - DD2

6 Ladson Elementary School - CCSD

7 Lambs Elementary School - CCSD

8 Malcolm C. Hursey Elementary School - CCSD

9 Mary Ford Elementary School - CCSD

10 Matilda F. Dunston Elementary School - CCSD

11 Midland Park Elementary School - CCSD

12 North Charleston Elementary School - CCSD

13 Oakbrook Elementary School - DD2

14 Pepperhill Elementary School - CCSD

15 Wendell B. Goodwin Elementary School Elementary School 
- CCSD

16 Windsor Hill Elementary School - DD2

Middle schools

 17Morningside Middle School - CCSD
 19Northwoods Middle School - CCSD
 20Oakbrook Middle School - DD2
 21River Oaks Middle School - DD2

High schools

 22Fort Dorchester High School - DD2
 23R. B. Stall High School - CCSD
 24North Charleston High School - CCSD

Special academic programs

 25Academic Magnet High School (9-12) - CCSD
 26Garrett Academy of Technology (9-12) - CCSD
 27Greg Mathis Charter High School (9-12) - CCSD
 28Jerry Zucker Middle School of Science (6-8) - CCSD
 29Liberty Hill Academy (K-12) - CCSD
 30Military Magnet Academy (6-12) - CCSD
 31Sixth Grade Academy at McNair (6) - CCSD

Private schools
 32 Cathedral Academy (K-12)
 33 Charleston County School of the Arts (6-12)
 34Eagle Military Academy (3-12)
 Northside Christian School (K-12) 35
 36Saint John Catholic School (K-8) - Diocese of Charleston

Post-secondary education
 Charleston Southern University
 Lowcountry Graduate Center
 Trident Technical College

Education in North Charleston, South Carolina
North Charleston